Bernd Müller (born 2 April 1949 in Berlin) is a former East German footballer.

Müller made 55 appearances for 1. FC Union Berlin in the DDR-Oberliga during his playing career.

References 

1949 births
Living people
Footballers from Berlin
East German footballers
Association football defenders
1. FC Union Berlin players
SV Lichtenberg 47 players